The Freedom of Information (Amendment) (Scotland) Act 2013 is an Act of the Scottish Parliament relating to freedom of information requests in Scotland. It amends the Freedom of Information (Scotland) Act 2002,

References 

Acts of the Scottish Parliament 2013
Government of Scotland
Freedom of information legislation in the United Kingdom